The Volleyball Vietnam League is the top-level volleyball league for both men and women in Vietnam. It is organized by the Volleyball Federation of Vietnam.

The champion team qualifies for the Men's or Women's AVC Club Volleyball Championship.

Men

Current clubs 2023
 Ninh Bình LienVietPostBank
 Sanest Khánh Hòa
 Hà Nội
 VLXD Bình Dương
 Biên Phòng	
 Hà Tĩnh
 TP. Hồ Chí Minh
 Thể Công
 Lavie Long An
 Đà Nẵng

Titles by season

Titles by club

Women

Current clubs 2023
 Geleximco Thái Bình
 Hóa chất Đức Giang Hà Nội
 VTV Bình Điền Long An
 Ninh Bình LienVietPostBank
 Bộ Tư lệnh Thông tin
 Than Quảng Ninh
 Ngân hàng Công Thương
 Hà Phú Thanh Hóa
 Kinh Bắc Bắc Ninh
 TP. Hồ Chí Minh

Titles by season

Titles by club

External links
 Official website

Sports leagues established in 2004
2004 establishments in Vietnam
Sports leagues in Vietnam
Volleyball competitions in Vietnam
Vietnam